Angela Johnson may also refer to:

Angela Johnson (basketball) (born 1953), Canadian Olympic basketball player
Angela Johnson (writer) (born 1961), children's author
Angela Davis Johnson, American painter
Angela Jonsson (born 1990), Indian model and actress
Anjelah Johnson (born 1982), comedian
Angela Jane Johnson (born 1964), first woman sentenced to death by a U.S. Federal jury since the 1950s, for the 1993 Iowa murders

See also
Angela John, singer